Joel Redhead (born 3 July 1986 in Gouyave) is a Grenadian sprinter. At the 2012 Summer Olympics, he competed in the Men's 200 metres. He came in eighth in the third heat and was therefore eliminated.

Personal bests

Outdoor
100 m: 10.43 s (wind: -1.0 m/s) –  New York, New York, 16 May 2013
200 m: 20.49 s (wind: -0.2 m/s) –  Fayetteville, Arkansas, 11 June 2009
400 m: 46.20 s –  Clermont, Florida, 11 June 2011

Indoor
60 m: 6.85 s –  New York, New York, 18 January 2014
200 m: 20.91 s –  Boston, Massachusetts, 8 February 2014
400 m: 47.55 s –  New York, New York, 29 February 2008

International competitions

References

External links
Tilastopaja biography

1986 births
Living people
Athletes (track and field) at the 2012 Summer Olympics
Commonwealth Games competitors for Grenada
Athletes (track and field) at the 2014 Commonwealth Games
Pan American Games competitors for Grenada
Athletes (track and field) at the 2011 Pan American Games
People from Saint John Parish, Grenada
Grenadian male sprinters
Olympic athletes of Grenada
World Athletics Championships athletes for Grenada